The second season of the Japanese animated television series A Certain Scientific Railgun, based on the manga of the same name, follows Mikoto Misaka in her attempt to stop the deadly project that involves her clones and the most powerful esper in Academy City named Accelerator, with unlikely help from Toma Kamijo. The season, known as A Certain Scientific Railgun S, was produced by J.C.Staff and directed by Tatsuyuki Nagai with series composition supervised by Seishi Minakami.

The series sees the return of the main cast members Rina Satō, Satomi Arai, Aki Toyosaki, and Kanae Itō, with the addition of Nozomi Sasaki and Atsushi Abe from A Certain Magical Index television series. A sequel was announced in October 2012, with the cast and staff from the first season confirming their return in the same month.

A Certain Scientific Railgun S aired in Japan on April 12, 2013, consisting of twenty-four episodes, and concluded on September 27. A third season was announced in October 2018.


Episode list

Cast and characters

Main

Recurring

Production

Development
A sequel to the 2009 anime television series A Certain Scientific Railgun was announced at Dengeki 20th Anniversary Festival in October 2012. A few days after it was announced, J.C.Staff was confirmed to be returning from the first season to produce the sequel, with the returning staff members Tatsuyuki Nagai as the director, Seishi Minakami as the series composition writer, and Yuichi Tanaka as the character animation designer. The series would be premiered in 2013, later announced to be on April 12, and consists of twenty-four episodes.

Writing
The series adapted the Sisters story arc from A Certain Scientific Railgun manga series. J.C.Staff producer Yuji Matsukura was glad that the popular story arc would be animated in the second season since it was still in the middle of serialization during the production of the first season. Nagai revealed that an original summer vacation story would be included in the series upon the conclusion of the Sisters story arc.

Casting
In October 2012, Rina Satō, Satomi Arai, Aki Toyosaki, and Kanae Itō were confirmed to be reprising their respective roles from the first season as Mikoto Misaka, Kuroko Shirai, Kazari Uiharu, and Ruiko Saten, with the addition of Nozomi Sasaki as the Sisters and Atsushi Abe as Toma Kamijo, both reprising their roles from A Certain Magical Index television series. In March 2013, Ikumi Hayama was revealed to be voicing Shinobu Nunotaba, a researcher associated with Level 6 Shift Project. In May 2013, additional voice actors were announced to be voicing the members of dark side organization ITEM, including Ami Koshimizu as Shizuri Mugino, Chinatsu Akasaki as Saiai Kinuhata, Maaya Uchida as Frenda Seivelun, and Aya Suzaki as Rikō Takitsubo.

Funimation announced in April 2014 the English dub cast for the series, including Mariela Ortiz as Nunotaba, Leah Clark as Seivelun, Lydia Mackay as Mugino, Apphia Yu as Kinuhata, and Megan Shipman as Takitsubo.

Music

Maiko Iuchi of I've Sound served as the composer of A Certain Scientific Railgun S. The second season uses six pieces of theme music: two openings and four endings. For the first sixteen episodes, the opening theme is "Sisters' Noise" by fripSide whilst the main ending theme is "Grow Slowly" by Yuka Iguchi. The ending theme for episodes 11 and 14 is "Stand Still" by Iguchi.

Marketing
A TV commercial ad, narrated by Satō, for A Certain Scientific Railgun S was aired on AT-X in March 2013. In the same month, Satō, Arai, Toyosaki, and Itō were present at Anime Contents Expo 2013 in Makuhari Messe to promote the series, where a 90-second promo video was released. Additional three TV commercial ads were aired on Tokyo MX in April 2013, each narrated by Arai, Toyosaki, and Itō.

Release

Broadcast
A Certain Scientific Railgun S began airing in Japan on AT-X and Tokyo MX on April 12, 2013, on MBS on April 13, on CBC on April 17, on BS11 on April 19, and on Tochigi TV on April 24.

Home media

Geneon Universal Entertainment released eight Blu-ray and DVD volumes of A Certain Scientific Railgun S in Japan starting July 24, 2013. Each volume contains a bonus novel written by Kazuma Kamachi titled A Certain Magical Index: Necessarius Special Admission Test. Funimation released a DVD volume containing the first twelve episodes of the series in North America on July 1, 2014, and another DVD volume containing the final twelve episodes on August 19, while a Blu-ray and DVD combo set containing the full season was released on January 19, 2016. Manga Entertainment released a Blu-ray and DVD combo set for the series in the United Kingdom on August 21, 2017.

Funimation began streaming the series on April 14, 2013, while it was added to Crunchyroll in December 2016 and to Tubi TV in December 2017. Hulu released the series in Japan on March 24, 2022. Muse Asia began streaming the series on their official YouTube channel on June 30, 2022.

Reception

Critical response
Rebecca Silverman of Anime News Network graded A Certain Scientific Railgun S 'B', feeling that the Sisters story arc in the series was not rehashed as compared to its earlier portrayal from the first season of A Certain Magical Index and lauding Misaka's appearance in it. Ian Wolf of Anime UK News scored the series 8 out of 10, describing the Sisters story arc as having a "lack of imagination" despite being told in a different approach (from Misaka's viewpoint rather than Kamijo's) but finding its story "feel[ing] a lot more emotional".

Scientific accuracy
Tsukasa Kano, a science writer who graduated from Nihon University and member of the Space Authors Club, discussed human cloning in A Certain Scientific Railgun S. He stated that there is a possibility but currently impractical due to the low yield rate among humans, while contradicted the 14-day development of a clone to a full appearance of a junior high school student as depicted in the series since it naturally needs to grow for up to 14 years, which requires 80,000 eggs harvested from people and 80,000 women to serve as "borrowed bellies" for impregnation.

Other media
A puzzle game by ASCII Media Works based on A Certain Scientific Railgun S, titled A Certain Scientific Railgun S Puzzle, was released on July 26, 2013. An 80-page official visual book for the series was released on March 27, 2014, which was bundled with a Blu-ray disc containing a brand-new episode titled .

Notes

References

External links
  
 

A Certain Magical Index episode lists
A Certain Magical Index
Certain Scientific Railgun S, A